Oruro (Hispanicized spelling) or Uru Uru is a city in Bolivia with a population of 264,683 (2012 calculation), about halfway between La Paz and Sucre in the Altiplano, approximately  above sea level.

It is Bolivia's fifth-largest city by population, after Santa Cruz de la Sierra, El Alto, La Paz, and Cochabamba. It is the capital of the Department of Oruro and the seat of the Roman Catholic Diocese of Oruro. Oruro has been subject to cycles of boom and bust owing to its dependence on the mining industry, notably tin, tungsten (wolfram), silver and copper.

History
The city was founded on November 1, 1606, by Don Manuel Castro de Padilla as a silver-mining center in the Urus region. At the time it was named Real Villa de San Felipe de Austria, after the Spanish monarch Philip III. It thrived for a while, but it was eventually abandoned as the silver mines became exhausted.

Oruro was reestablished by European Bolivians in the late nineteenth century as a tin mining center. It was named after the native tribe Uru-Uru. For a time, the La Salvadora tin mine was the most important source of tin in the world. Gradually, as this resource became less plentiful, Oruro again went into a decline. Its economy is still based on the mining industry.

Economy
While traditionally based upon mining, Oruro has become increasingly popular for tourism since the late 20th century. In the early 21st century, Oruro's economy grew through trade and economic connections with Chile, especially for exporting products to Pacific markets. It transported products by road through Chile to the Pacific port of Iquique to open new connections to external markets; it also used the rail connection through Uyuni to the port at Antofagasta for exports. Thanks to increased road building, Oruro has become important as a waystation on the overland route of goods from the Atlantic port of Santos, Brazil, through Puerto Suárez and Santa Cruz to the capital, La Paz.

The city is served by the Oruro Airport.

Culture and education
Despite its economic decline, the city attracts numerous tourists to its Carnaval de Oruro, considered one of the great folkloric events in South America for its masked "diablada" and Anata.
The Oruru Carnival was discovered in 1559, when the Augustinian priests were on the land, the festival is in honor of the Virgin of Candlemas.

The Oruro Symphony Orchestra is based in the city. Aymara painter and printmaker Alejandro Mario Yllanes (1913–1960) was born here.

The Universidad Técnica de Oruro, noted for its engineering school, is located in Oruro.

Climate 
Oruro lies north of the salty lakes Uru Uru and Poopó. It is three hours (by bus) from La Paz. Located at an altitude of 3709 meters above sea level, Oruro is well known for its cold weather. Warmer temperatures generally take place during August, September and October, after the worst of the winter chills and before the summer rains. From May to early July, night time temperatures combined with cool wind can bring the temperature down to about -20 °C. Summers are warmer, and, although it is an arid area, it has considerable rainfall between November and March.  The Köppen climate classification describes the climate as a cold subtropical highland climate, bordering on a cold semi-arid climate, abbreviated Cwb and Bsk. Due to the warm days and dry winters, snow is not a frequent occurrence as much as the bitter cold (especially at night); however, flurries can fall usually once every few years, most recently July 4, 2015. The other three most recent snowfalls were those of 13 June 2013, 1 September 2010 (with accumulation), as well as one in 2008.

Main attractions 

Museo Patiño, former residence of "tin baron" Simón Iturri Patiño
Museo Mineralógico (Mineralogical Museum): has exhibits of precious stones, minerals, and fossils
Museo Etnográfico Minero (Ethnographical Mining Museum): housed in a mine tunnel, depicts methods of Bolivian mining
Museo Nacional Antropológico Eduardo López Rivas (National Anthropological Museum): displays tools and information on the Chipaya and Uru tribes, and about Carnaval de Oruro.
Churches: Catedral Nuestra Señora de la Asunción, Santuario de la Virgen del Socavón, Iglesia de Cunchupata
Inti Raymi, a mine

Education
Because of a high proportion of German-speaking residents, many of whom came as immigrants to work in the mines, the area once had a German school, Deutsche Schule Oruro.

Gallery

Twin towns – sister cities
 Lima, Peru
 Iquique, Chile
 Calama, Chile

Notable people from Oruro
 Elsa Cladera de Bravo (1922–2005), trade union leader
 Hilda Mundy (1912–1980), Bolivian writer, poet & journalist

See also 
 Jach'a Ch'ankha
 Qala Qala

References

External links

 Oruro's full information about hotels, history, carnival, tourism, pictures, videos, and news
 Weather in Oruro
 Carnaval de Oruro
   Oruro's Carnival]
 Oruro's Carnival
 Oruro

 
Populated places in Oruro Department
Tin mines in Bolivia
Populated places established in 1606
1606 establishments in the Spanish Empire
Populated places in the Altiplano

eo:Oruro